WOZ, WoZ or Woz may refer to:

 Woz, a nickname of Steve Wozniak (born 1950), an American computer engineer who co-founded Apple, Inc.
 Wheels of Zeus (WoZ), a company founded by Steve Wozniak
 Woz Cup, the Segway Polo world championship named after Wozniak
 Woz U, a tech education platform launched by Wozniak

Characters
 Woz, a character in the Japanese television series Kamen Rider Zi-O
 Woz, a character in the anime and manga series Eureka Seven
Betty Woz, from the song  Betty Woz Gone  by English girl group Stooshe

Television
 "Woz", an episode of the science fiction television series Lexx
 "The Woz",  the first episode of the American animated television show Code Monkeys
Scott the Woz, a program broadcast by the U.S. cable TV channel G4

Other uses
 La Woz, a cultural society of the Antillean country of Saint Lucia
 WOZ Die Wochenzeitung, a Swiss newspaper
 "Woz Not Woz", a 2004 song by Swedish DJs Eric Prydz and Steve Angello

See also